Stan S. Frownfelter (born May 12, 1951) is an American businessman and former Democratic member of the Kansas House of Representatives, representing the 37th district in Wyandotte County. He was first elected in 2006 and took office on January 3, 2007. He served as the House Assistant Minority Leader from 2017 to 2019. Until 2020, he had never faced primary opposition.

Frownfelter has a bachelor's degree from Emporia State University. In 2019, Frownfelter ran for the Wyandotte County Public Utilities Board and lost. During that campaign, Frownfelter told a debate audience that he would not run for reelection to the Kansas legislature in 2020.

Frownfelter lost the August 4, 2020, Democratic primary election to Aaron Coleman.

At the urging of some Democratic state legislators, Frownfelter pursued an unsuccessful write-in campaign for the November General election. Because of the controversy surrounding Aaron Coleman, two other people, Wyandotte County Republican Central Committee Treasurer Kristina Smith, and Keith "T-Bone" Jordan, a DJ for KQRC-FM 98.9, “The Rock" also tried, unsuccessfully for write-in votes.

As of 2020, Frownfelter's district has 4,928 registered Democrats and 2,155 Republicans, with Libertarians at 99 and 4,036 unaffiliated.

Committee memberships
2019–2020
Commerce, Labor and Economic Development (ranking minority member)
Insurance
Financial Institutions and Pensions
Energy, Utilities and Telecommunications

2017–2018
 Legislative Budget (House)
 Calendar and Printing

References

External links
 Legislative profile

1951 births
21st-century American businesspeople
21st-century American politicians
Emporia State University alumni
Living people
Democratic Party members of the Kansas House of Representatives
Politicians from Kansas City, Kansas